Fathabad-e Jusheqan (also Romanized as Fatḩābād-e Jūsheqān; also known as Fatḩābād and Fatḩābād Jūshegān) is a village in Kuhpayeh Rural District, in the Central District of Kashan County, Isfahan Province, Iran. At the 2006 census, its population was 159, in 44 families.

References 

Populated places in Kashan County